Mike Sweeney (born 1973) is an American baseball player.

Mike or Michael Sweeney may also refer to:

Mike Sweeney (DJ) (born 1947), British musician and radio DJ
Mike Sweeney (musician), American musician
Mike Sweeney (soccer) (born 1959), Canadian soccer player
Mike M. Sweeney, member of the Ohio House of Representatives from Cleveland
Michael Sweeney (athlete), Irish-American track and field athlete
Michael Sweeney (California politician) (born 1950), mayor of Hayward, California
Michael A. Sweeney, member of the Ohio House of Representatives from Cleveland